Ellory is a surname. Notable people with the surname include:

 Alfred John Ellory (1920–2009), British musician 
 Ellory Elkayem (born 1970), New Zealand film director
 R. J. Ellory (born 1965), English author

See also
 Elleray, surname
 Ellery (surname)